José Miguel Oviedo (1934 – 19 December 2019) was a Peruvian writer and literary critic, born in Lima. He received his doctorate from the Pontificia Universidad Católica in 1961, afterwards teaching at the same institution. Coming to the US in 1975, he taught at State University of New York, Indiana University, and UCLA.  In 1988 he was appointed Trustee Professor of Latin American Literature at the University of Pennsylvania and remained there until his retirement and move to Emeritus Professor in 2000. He was the recipient of important scholarships such as the Rockefeller grant and the Guggenheim fellowship(1972).

Scholarly work 
Oviedo was best known as a scholar of Peruvian and Latin American literature. His critical surveys covered writers such as Ricardo Palma, Mario Vargas Llosa, and José Martí. He also compiled various anthologies of Peruvian prose and poetry, Cuban short stories, 19th century Latin American short stories, etc. His lifelong friendship with Vargas Llosa led to her dedicating her work Who Killed Palomino Molero? to him in 1987.

His principal work was a two-volume history of Latin American literature: Historia de la literatura hispanoamericana. This work was published in four installments between 1995 and 2000; split into: 
De los orígenes a la Emancipación (1995)
Del Romanticismo al Modernismo (1997)
Postmodernismo, Vanguardia, Regionalismo 
De Borges al presente (2000).

He also published several short story collections: 
Soledad & Compañía (1987)
La vida maravillosa (1988)
Cuaderno imaginario (1996).

Oviedo Prize 
The University of Pennsylvania created the "José Miguel Oviedo Undergraduate Student Paper Award in Latin American and Latino Studies" in his honor.

Death 
Oviedo died in Philadelphia, United States, aged 85.

References

1934 births
2019 deaths
Pontifical Catholic University of Peru alumni
Academic staff of the Pontifical Catholic University of Peru
University of Pennsylvania faculty
Peruvian writers
Peruvian anthologists
20th-century Peruvian writers
21st-century Peruvian writers